Hoskinson may refer to:

Charles Hoskinson, American entrepreneur, founder of the Cardano blockchain platform
Jim Hoskinson, television director
Linda Hoskinson, elementary school teacher in Ohio, subjected to unlawful sex discrimination when she became pregnant
Nadine Hoskinson (died 2010), popular British writer of over 40 romance novels under the pen-name Elizabeth Oldfield

See also
Murder of Vicki Lynne Hoskinson (1976–1984), 8-year-old American girl who disappeared whilst riding her bicycle
Hoskin
Hoskins
Huskinson